The Church of St. Stephen Harding in Apátistvánfalva or Apátistvánfalvian Church (  Prekmurje dialect: Števanovska cerkev Svétoga Števana Hardinga) is a Baroque Roman Catholic Church in the village of Apátistvánfalva (Števanovci), Hungary. It is near the Hungarian-Slovenian border, in the Vendvidék region. Its patron saint Stephen Harding was an English saint and the founder of the Cistercian Order.

Because this area is traditionally ethnically Slovenian, in the past mass was offered only in Prekmurje Slovenian. Today mass is offered in Hungarian and in the local Prekmurje Slovenian dialect.

History of the church
The church was built in 1785. The bishop of Vas, János Szily, aided in the construction and also supported building a school in the village. The first priest was János Marits. The new parish included Permise (now Kétvölgy), Börgölin/Újbalázsfalva (now Apátistvánfalva), Orfalu, Rábatótfalu (now Szentgotthárd), Szakonyfalu, and sometimes Markovci, now in Slovenia.

By the 12th century, Apátistvánfalva was a Cistercian lordship. In 1183 Béla III of Hungary founded a Cistercian abbey in Szentgotthárd. The monks arrived from the Trois-Fontaines Abbey, Champagne, France.

For many years, the Hungarian Slovenes had attended church in Rábakethely (near Szentgotthárd), Felsőszölnök, or Great Dolenci (Slovenia). In Alsószölnök where German, Slovenian and Hungarian people lived, the believers went to Sankt Martin an der Raab in Austria (a church was also built in Alsószölnök built in 1816).

Bishop Szily supported masses being offered in the local language (Croatian, the Prekmurje dialect, or German), and therefore he appointed Marits.

In 2005 Jožef Smej, the bishop of Maribor, and few Hungarian and Slovenian priests blessed a memorial tablet in the church listing the names of Apátistvánfalvian priests and chaplains.

Building
The baroque murals were created by an unknown painter. The High Altar shows the Legend of St. Stephen Harding. The Trinity is depicted above the mural.

There is an organ in the choir. The organ was made in 1894 and restored in 2007. Prior to the restoration a small organ was used. The steeple has two bells.

Near the church are a school, cemetery, and parish office, war memorial, and statue of the Virgin Mary.

Gallery

Priest of Apátistvánfalva

János Marits
János Marits was of Slovenian descent was born in Sveti Jurij, Rogašovci (Slovenia) in around 1757 or 1767. He learned  theology in Győr. His consecration was September 20, 1783. He was a clerk in Dolenci. He then was a chaplain in Rábakethely. Marits built the Apátistvánfalvian school and hired the teacher György Marits (born in Gerečavci in 1766 and died in 1810). Marits was the first priest in Apátistvánfalva. In the future, he worked in Felsőszölnök. János Marits died April 24, 1800. He spoke Slovene and German.

István Hüll P.

István Hüll P. was born Dolnji Slaveči.

József Teklics
József Teklics was of Croatian descent, and was born in Szentpéterfa on April 26, 1770. His parents, Sándor Teklits and Katalin, were petty noblemen. His consecration was on September 14, 1793. He was chaplain, then priest in Apátistvánfalva (1793–1795), Turnišče (1795–1796), chaplain and clerk in Oberwart (1796–1797), chaplain in Szepetnek (1797–1801), and finally, priest in Szőce. After 1805 he was a chaplain in Nagygencs (now Gencsapáti) and Gaas. In 1806 he lived in  Győr. He died sometime after 1824.

György Küzmics
György Küzmics was of Slovenian descent and was born in Dolnji Slaveči on December 14, 1752. He learned theology in Győr and Buda. He was consecrated in Grad, Slovenia on September 13, 1779. He was then chaplain in Rábakethely (1779–1781), priest in Gornji Petrovci (1781–1785), and finally in Dolenci (1785–1795). He worked in Apátistvánfalva by September 26, 1795 until February 27, 1810. Küzmics was dean of Őrség. He spoke Slovenian and German.

Mátyás Ivanóczy
Mátyás Ivanóczy was a Slovenian petty nobleman, not Hungarian. The old name of Ivanóczys is Kodila or Kobila. The Ivanóczy name alluded to the family provenance Ivanóc (Ivanovci). He was born in Ivanovci on February 2, 1781. His parents were Mihály Kodila and Katalin. His consecration was in 1804. He was chaplain in Turnišče (1804–1808), Beltinci (1808–1810), and a priest in Apátistvánfalva by May 8, 1810. He died on April 18, 1834. He spoke Slovene and German.

Imre Károly Árendás
Imre Károly Árendás was the first Hungarian priest in Apátistvánfalva. He was born in Tardos on October 22, 1798. His parents were János Árendás and Katalin Gálitz. In Vienna he learned theology, then spent 3 years in Szombathely. His consecration was on October 28, 1821. He was an educator by 1821, spent 1822 in Nagycsákány (now Csákánydoroszló) in the Batthyány-castle. He was a  chaplain in Rábakethely (1822–1823), Vasszentmihály (1823–1824), Nyőgér (1824–1825.), Szepetnek (1825–1828), clerk in Kőszegszerdahely (1828), priest in Alsószölnök (1829–1834), then Apátistvánfalva (1834–1851). In 1851he  was a superannuate. He died in Pásztorháza on December 30, 1857. He spoke Croatian, Slovene, and German.

József Borovnják

János Szerényi
János Szerényi's real name was János Czvörnyek. He was of Slovenian descent. He was born in Grad, Slovenia, on March 9, 1815. His parents were  György Czvörnyek and Éva Szlámár villeins. He was consecrated on July 20, 1842. He was a chaplain in Murska Sobota (1842–1844), Črenšovci (1844–1845), Križevci (1845–1847), Bogojina (1847), Sveti Jurij, Rogašovci (1848–1852), Beltinci (1848–1852). He was a priest in Apátistvánfalva by February 1852. He died on March 31, 1869. He spoke German and Slovene.

József Ivanóczy
József Ivanóczy was born in Ivanovci on March 17, 1842. His parents were Miklós Kódela and Rozália Borovnyák. His consecration was on March 9, 1868. He was a chaplain in Beltinci (1868), Felsőszölnök (1868–1869), priest in Apátistvánfalva (1869), some time again chaplain in Črenšovci (1869–1870), Tišina (1870–1872), Lendvavásárhely (now Dobrovnik) (1872–1873), Felsőszölnök (1873–1878), priest in Sveti Sebeščan (1878–1896). He was in Križevci by 1897, until  1901 as a clerk. In 1901 was chaplain in Črenšovci. Died in Radkersburg June 21, 1903. He spoke Slovene and German language.

István Scsavnicsár
István Scsavnicsár was born in Rakičan, near Murska Sobota on August 10, 1828. His parents were István Scsavnicsár and Katalin Szecsko. His consecration was on March 8, 1855. He was a chaplain in Grad, Slovenia (1855–1856), clerk in Gornji Petrovci (1856–1869), priest in Apátistvánfalva by 1869. He died on January 15, 1894. He spoke Slovene and German.

Károly Fodor
Károly Fodor was born in Krajišnik, in  Vojvodina, and was of Hungarian-Serbian descent. He was born on November 11, 1839. His parents were Sándor Fodor and Fáni Vresits. In the VII. and VIII. class, he was a small seminarist. He was consecrated on July 20, 1863. He was a chaplain in Felsőszölnök (1863-1865.), Tišina (1865–1868), Beltinci (1868–1869) and priest in Apátistvánfalva (1869), and at Gornji Petrovci (1869- 1894). By August 1, 1894 a new pastor in Apátistvánfalva. He died on July 24, 1908. He spoke Slovene.

István Kóczján
István Kóczján was a Slovenian priest. He was born in Sodešinci on October 29, 1866. His parents were József Kóczján and Ilona Pertóczi. He was consecrated on July 16, 1891, and was chaplain in Grad, Slovenia (1891), after clerk (1892), clerk in Tömörd (1892-1893), chaplain in Murska Sobota (1893–1894), clerk in Apátistvánfalva (1894), priest in Gornji Petrovci (1894–1908), and was a priest in Apátistvánfalva by October 1, 1908. He died January 3, 1925. His tomb is in the cemetery. He spoke Slovene.

István Tóth

István Tóth was born in 1955 in Felsőszölnök. Between 1970 and 1974 he attended the Secondary School of the St. Benedict Order at Pannonhalma. He pursued his studies for priesthood at the Theology College of the Bishoprics of Győr. He died in 2001.

Ferenc Merkli

Ferenc Merkli was born in Szakonyfalu.

Tibor Tóth

Chaplains

György Kultsár
György Kultsár was a Hungarian priest. He was  born in Nemesvis in Sopron country around 1766. He learned  in the Seminary in Bratislava. His consecration was on August 24, 1790. He was a chaplain in Apátistvánfalva (1790–1791), Szentgyörgyvölgy (1791–1792), Páka (1792–1793), clerk in Egyházashetye (1793, --1797), priest in Rábakovácsi (1797–1825). In 1825 he was a superannuate. He died in Szombathely on October 27, 1830.

Péter Bognár
Péter Bognár was born in Slovakia, in Michal na Ostrove on June 22, 1768. His father was Ferenc Bognár and his mother Katalin Katona were both petty noblemen. He learned theology in Bratislava (1787–1790) and Szombathely (1790–1791). His consecration was on August 28, 1791. He was a chaplain  in Apátistvánfalva (1791–1793), Vámoscsalád (1793–1799), priest in Egyházashetye by 1799 November, until 1804 September. After that, he was also a pastor. He died December 5, 1814. He spoke German.

Imre Ballia
Imre Ballia was of Hungarian descent. He was born in Nemesbőd on January 15, 1768. His parents were petty noblemen, János Ballia and Katalin Dallos. In Bratislava and Szombathely learned theology. He was consecrated  on August 26, 1792. He was a chaplain in Apátistvánfalva (1792–1793), Ivánc (1793), Nagysitke (new Sitke), then pastor by 1794 until 1797. He was then a chaplain in Szombathely (1797), priest in Szentkirály (1797–1813), then in Ják by 1813. He died April 8, 1828. He spoke German.

József Hompasz
József Hompasz was born in Csém, March 3, 1771. His parents wereJános Humpász and Anna, both petty noblemen. He was consecrated on August 24, 1794. He was a chaplain in Lendava (1794), Apátistvánfalva (1795–1796), Sárvár (1796), Szepetnek (1796–1797), Oberwart (1797–1798), Vámoscsalád (1798–1800), Szentpéterfa (1800–1802), clerk in Nagykölked (1802–1803), priest in Kukmér (1803–1806), chaplain in Rechnitz (1806–1813), pastor in Weiden bei Rechnitz (1813–1816). He died June 13, 1837.
He spoke Croatian and German language.

János László
János László was a Hungarian priest, born in Megyehíd (near Sárvár) on December 13, 1769. His parents were Pál László (civil servant) and Erzsébet Kiss. He  learned  theology in Bratislava and Szombathely. His consecration was on September 14, 1793. He was a chaplain in Acsád for 2 and one-half months, Kám (1794–1796), Zalaegerszeg (1796–1798), Hosszúpereszteg (1798–1799), Apátistvánfalva (1799–1800), Páka (1801–1806). Priest in Egyházashollós by December 1, 1806. He died January 28, 1817. He spoke German.

János Vogrincsics
János Vogrincsics was of Slovenian descent ) and was the  first Slovenian chaplain in Apátistvánfalva. He was born in Pertoča around 1778. He learned philosophy at a small seminary. His consecration was on December 18, 1802. He was chaplain in Apátistvánfalva, Beltinci, Murska Sobota (1802–1804), priest in Kančovci after Miklós Küzmics (1804–1805) and died in his place of birth (Pertoča) on February 7, 1806. He spoke Slovene.

Ferenc Koszednár
Ferenc Koszednár was of Slovenian descent. He was  born around 1774 in Pertoča. He  was a small seminarist. He was consecrated in 1804. chaplain in Apátistvánfalva for 7 months, clerk in Őriszentpéter for two weeks, chaplain in Vasszentmihály (1805), Murska Sobota (1805–1807), clerk in Dolenci (1807-1808) and Felsőszölnök (1808). He was a priest in Kančovci by November, 1808. He died October 25, 1810. He spoke Slovene and some German.

János Farkas
János Farkas was of Hungarian descent. He was born in Szany on May 14, 1780. His consecration was in 1804. He was a chaplain in Letenye (1804–1805), Apátistvánfalva (1805–1806), Salamonvár (1806–1810), Rábahídvég (1810). He was a priest in Boncódfölde by 1811. He died on December 30, 1825. He spoke German.

Ferenc Kováts
Ferenc Kováts was born in Strehovci on August 16, 1805. His father was János Kovács. His consecration was on September 14, 1831. He was a chaplain in Črenšovci (1831–1833), Dolenci (1833–1834), Apátistvánfalva (1834), priest in Dolenci by 1835 until November 5, 1857, when he died. He spoke Slovene.

Mátyás Slezák
Mátyás Slezák was born in Schachendorf, in Burgenland, in 1821. Slezák is of Croatian descent. By 1842, he worked in Apátistvánfalva as a  teacher. The house where he lived today stands near the school. According to the notes he was an honest and gentle man. He was the first cantor in the village. He died on March 1, 1890. His son Henrik also was a teacher in Sárvár.

Károly Oreovecz

Károly Oreovecz was born in Kétvölgy.

Gábor Sebestyén

Sources
 
 
 
 
 
 
 

18th-century Roman Catholic church buildings in Hungary
Baroque church buildings in Hungary
Roman Catholic churches completed in 1785
Buildings and structures in Vas County
Tourist attractions in Vas County